Rakat-e Olya (also Romanized as Rak‘at-e ‘Olyā) is a village in Donbaleh Rud-e Shomali Rural District, Dehdez District, Izeh County, Khuzestan Province, Iran. At the 2006 census, its population was 100, in 21 families.

References 

Populated places in Izeh County